Qazaghan (died 1358) was the amir of the Qara'unas (1345 at the latest – 1358) and the effective ruler of the Chagatai ulus (1346–1358).

The following opinions were expressed about the ethnic origin of the Qazaghan: 1) Vasily Bartold wrote that Qazaghan is very likely from the Kauchin tribe; he believed that the Kauchins were a Turkisized Mongol tribe; 2) In his other early work, Bartold called Qazaghan a Turkic emir.

Qazaghan's lineage is mostly unknown; it is possible that he became head of the Qara'unas through appointment instead of inheritance In 1345 he rebelled against his sovereign, the Chagatai Khan Qazan, but was defeated. The following year he tried again and succeeded in killing the khan. Qazan's death signified the end of the effective power of the Chagatai khans within the ulus; subsequent khans were rulers in name only. Qazaghan, in the interest of maintaining an image of legitimacy, contented himself with his title of amir and conferred the title of khan on descendants of Genghis Khan of his own choosing: first Danishmendji (1346–1348) and then Bayan Quli (1348–1358). 

During the twelve years that Qazaghan served as the power behind the throne, the khanate devolved into a loose confederation of tribes that respected the overall authority of Qazaghan and his puppet khans, although he primarily commanded the loyalty of the tribes of the southern portion of the ulus. Following the example of the khans before him, Qazaghan raided northern India. He also sent several thousand troops to aid the Sultan of Delhi, Muhammad bin Tughluq, against rebels in his country in 1350 or 1351 and also supported his son Firuz Shah Tughlaq to the throne. Following complaints from the Arlat and the Arpardi tribes, who were members of the ulus, of raids by the Kartids under Mu'izzu'd-Din, Qazaghan coordinated a punitive expedition with most of the tribes of the southern part of the ulus. The coalition sacked Herat and gathered a large amount of plunder. 

In 1358 Qazaghan was assassinated by the son of Borolday, who had been amir of the Qara'unas before Qazaghan. He had aroused the anger of his murderer by denying him the tumen of Borolday. He was succeeded as leader of the Qara'unas by his son, ‘Abdullah.

Notes

References
Manz, Beatrice Forbes, The Rise and Rule of Tamerlane. Cambridge University Press, 1989, .

Year of birth unknown
1358 deaths
Mongol Empire people
Mongol Empire Muslims
Mongol rulers
Chagatai khans
14th-century Muslims